

Achosauromorphs

Newly named dinosaurs
Data courtesy of George Olshevsky's dinosaur genera list.

Mammals

Eutherians

Cetaceans

References